Shawnna Bolick (born 1975) is an American politician and a former Republican member of the Arizona House of Representatives representing District 20 from 2019 to 2023.

Political career 
Before being elected to the Arizona legislature, she was a consultant to the Arizona Charter School Association and the Goldwater Institute. She ran unsuccessfully for Arizona House seats in District 11 and District 28 before winning a 2018 election for the 20th District.

During the COVID-19 pandemic, she opposed the expansion of mail-in voting.

Attempt to overturn the 2020 election 
After Joe Biden won Arizona in the 2020 presidential election and President Donald Trump refused to concede and made claims of voter fraud, Bolick urged Congress to throw out the presidential election results from Arizona and give the state's electoral college votes to Trump.

She also introduced legislation in January 2021 to rewrite the election laws in Arizona to give the state legislature the power to reject the election results "at any time before the presidential inauguration" (i.e., even after the results were certified by the Secretary of State and by the governor and the electoral votes counted by Congress). At the time, the legislature was controlled by the Republican Party. Some contend that the bill is inconsistent with the state constitution. Bolick's legislation would also prevent judges from throwing out baseless court cases without evidence; the cases would instead have to be adjudicated by a jury.

The bill, Arizona House Bill 2720, died in committee.

She was a candidate in the 2022 Arizona Secretary of State election, but lost to State Representative Mark Finchem in the Republican primary.

Personal life
Bolick moved to Arizona in 2001. She is married to Arizona Supreme Court Justice Clint Bolick. Justice Bolick is a longtime friend of U.S. Supreme Court Justice Clarence Thomas, who is godfather to Bolick’s son. She has two children.

References

Living people
Republican Party members of the Arizona House of Representatives
21st-century American politicians
21st-century American women politicians
Women state legislators in Arizona
1975 births